The men's singles badminton tournament at the 1995 IBF World Championships were held in Lausanne, Switzerland, between 22 May and 28 May 1995. Following the results of the men's singles.

Main stage

Section 1

Section 2

Section 3

Section 4

Section 5

Section 6

Section 7

Section 8

Section 9

Section 10

Section 11

Section 12

Section 13

Section 14

Section 15

Section 16

Final stage

External links
BWF Results

1995 IBF World Championships